Nigel Westlake is an Australian composer, musician and conductor. As a composer for the screen, his film credits include the feature films Ali's Wedding, Paper Planes, Miss Potter, Babe, Babe: Pig in the City, Children of the Revolution and The Nugget. He also composed the theme for SBS World News.

Biography
Westlake was born in Perth, Western Australia, the son of clarinettist Donald Westlake. 

Westlake studied the clarinet with his father, Donald (principal clarinettist, Sydney Conservatorium of Music 1961-1979) and subsequently left school early to pursue a performance career in music. 

By the age of 17, Westlake was touring Australia and the world, performing as a freelance clarinetist, bass clarinetist and saxophonist with ballet companies, a circus troupe, chamber music ensembles, fusion bands and orchestras. 

In 1983, Westlake studied bass clarinet and composition in the Netherlands  and was appointed composer in residence for ABC Radio National in 1984.

From 1987 to 1992 Westlake was resident clarinettist with The Australia Ensemble, and went on to join guitarist John Williams' group Attacca. 

In 2008, Westlake founded the Smugglers of Light Foundation in memory of his son Eli, to promote cultural awareness and empowerment through music and film in youth and Indigenous Australian communities.

Personal life
Westlake is married to Jan Loquet Westlake, and together, they had two sons. Their son Eli was killed in a road rage incident on 7 June 2008, a few weeks before his 22nd birthday. Westlake composed Missa Solis - Requiem for Eli and dedicated it to Eli. It was premiered by the Melbourne Symphony Orchestra at the Myer Music Bowl in February 2011.

Filmography
 Candy Regentag (1989)
 Act of Necessity (1991)
 Antarctica (1991)
 Backsliding (1991)
 Babe (1995)
 Children of the Revolution (1996)
 Wild Australia: The Edge (1996)
 Babe: Pig in the City (1998)
 A Little Bit of Soul (1998)
 Solarmax (2000)
 The Nugget (2002)
 Horseplay (2003)
 Hell Has Harbour Views (2005)
 Miss Potter (2006)
 Stepfather of the Bride (2006)
 Paper Planes (2015)
 Ali's Wedding (and soundtrack) (2017)
 Blueback (2022)

Awards and nominations
In 1985: Westlake won Jazz Action Society Composition Competition.
In 1988: Westlake, won Gold Medal at the New York International Radio Festival.
In 2004, Westlake was awarded the HC Coombs Creative Arts Fellowship at the Australian National University.
In 2012, Westlake received an Honorary Doctorate of Music from the University of New South Wales.

Australian Academy of Cinema and Television Arts (AACTA) Awards
 2015 - AACTA Award Best Original Music Score - Paper Planes - nominated 
 2017 - AACTA Award Best Original Score - Ali's Wedding  - nominated

APRA Awards
The APRA Awards are held in Australia and New Zealand by the Australasian Performing Right Association to recognise songwriting skills, sales and airplay performance by its members annually.

! 
|-
| 1992
| "Refractions at Summer Cloud Bay"
| Contemporary Classical Composition of the Year
| 
| 
|-
| 1996
| Babe
| Best Film Score
| 
| 
|-
|rowspan="2"| 1998
| The Edge
| Most Performed Classical Work
| 
| 
|-
| Songs from the Forest || Most Performed Classical Work ||  ||
|-
|rowspan="2"| 1999 || Babe: Pig in the City || Best Film Score ||  ||
|-
| "Laikan" (Australia Ensemble)  || Most Performed Contemporary Classical Composition ||  || 
|-
|rowspan="2"| 2003 || Horse Play || Best Feature Film Score ||  || 
|-
| The Nugget || Best Feature Film Score ||  || 
|-
|rowspan="4"| 2005 || Piano Concerto – Michael Kieran Harvey || Best Performance of an Australian Composition ||  ||  
|-
| Six Fish – Saffire Guitar Quartet || Instrumental Work of the Year ||  || 
|-
| Crystal Spheres – Solarmax film orchestra || Orchestral Work of the Year ||  ||  
|-
|  Hell Has Harbour Views  || Best Music for a Mini-Series or Telemovie ||  || 
|-
|rowspan="4"| 2007 || When the Clock Strikes Me - Rebecca Lagos (soloist), Sydney Symphony || Best Performance of an Australian Composition ||  || 
|-
|rowspan="2"| Miss Potter  || Feature Film Score of the Year ||  || 
|-
| Best Soundtrack Album ||  || 
|-
| Stepfather of the Bride || Best Music for a Mini-Series or Telemovie ||  || 
|-
|rowspan="2"| 2008 || Rare Sugar - The Australia Ensemble and Catherine McCorkill (clarinetist) || Best Performance of an Australian Composition ||  || 
|-
| Glass Soldier Suite – Melbourne Symphony Orchestra, Geoffrey Payne (cornet), Jean-Louis Forestier (conductor) || Orchestral Work of the Year ||  || 
|-
|rowspan="2"| 2012 ||rowspan="2"| Missa Solis – Requiem for Eli (with Sydney Symphony Orchestra) || Work of the Year – Orchestral ||  || 
|-
| Performance of the Year ||  || 
|-
|2014 ||| Compassion (with Lior & Sydney Symphony Orchestra) || Work of the Year – Orchestral ||  || 
|-

ARIA Music Awards
The ARIA Music Awards is an annual awards ceremony that recognises excellence, innovation, and achievement across all genres of Australian music. They commenced in 1987. 

! 
|-
| 1991
| Road to Xanadu - The Genius That Was China (with Michael Askill)
| Best Original Soundtrack or Musical Theatre Cast Album
| 
| 
|-
| 1993
| Antarctica
| Best Original Soundtrack or Musical Theatre Cast Album
| 
| 
|-
| 1996
| Babe
| Best Original Soundtrack or Musical Theatre Cast Album
| 
| 
|-
| 2013
| Missa Solis: Requiem for Eli (with Melbourne Symphony Orchestra)
|rowspan="2" |Best Classical Album
| 
|rowspan="2" | 
|-
| 2014
| Compassion (with Lior and Sydney Symphony Orchestra)
| 
|-
| 2015
| Paper Planes – Original Motion Picture Soundtrack (with Melbourne Symphony Orchestra)
| Best Original Soundtrack or Musical Theatre Cast Album
| 
| 
|-
| 2017
| Ali's Wedding (soundtrack) (with Sydney Symphony Orchestra, Lior, Joseph Tawadros & Slava Grigoryan)
| Best Original Soundtrack or Musical Theatre Cast Album
| 
| 
|-
| 2019
| Nigel Westlake: Spirit of the Wild / Steve Reich: The Desert Music (with Diana Doherty, Sydney Symphony Orchestra & David Robertson, Synergy Vocals)
| Best Classical Album
| 
| 
|-

Film Critics Circle of Australia Awards
 2018 - Best Original Music - Ali's Wedding - Nominee
 2016 - Best Music - Paper Planes - Nominee
 1997 - Best Original Music - Babe - Won

International Film Music Critics Award (IFMCA)
 2007 - Best Original Score for a Comedy Film - Miss Potter

References

Further reading 
 Barkl, Michael. 1997.  Nigel Westlake.  The Oxford Companion to Australian Music (ed. Warren Bebbington).  Melbourne:  OUP.

External links

Rimshot Music
Air-Edel Associates

1958 births
APRA Award winners
ARIA Award winners
Australian film score composers
Living people
Male film score composers
Musicians from Perth, Western Australia
Sydney Conservatorium of Music alumni